Podkamenka is a rural locality (a settlement) in Vokhtozhskoye Rural Settlement, Gryazovetsky District, Vologda Oblast, Russia. The population was 41 as of 2002.

Geography 
Podkamenka is located 116 km northeast of Gryazovets (the district's administrative centre) by road. Vostrogsky is the nearest rural locality.

References 

Rural localities in Gryazovetsky District